The 2019 UNCAF Women's Interclub Championship was the fourth edition of the UNCAF Women's Club Championship, Central America's premier women's club football organized by UNCAF. The tournament was played in Managua, Nicaragua between 17 and 22 September 2019.

Unifut from Guatemala are the defending champions. All games were 70 minutes in duration.

Teams
All seven UNCAF associations entered the tournament, with each association entering one team.

Venues
All matches were played at the Estadio Nacional in Managua.

Group stage
The seven teams were divided into two groups: one group of four teams and one group of three teams. The group winners and runners-up advance to the semi-finals.

All times were local, CST (UTC−6).

Group A

Group B

Knockout stage

Bracket

Semi-finals

Third place match

Final

References

External links
Fútbol Femenino – Torneo Interclubes, UNCAFut.com

2019
2019 in women's association football
2019 in Central American football
2019 in Nicaraguan sport
September 2019 sports events in North America
International association football competitions hosted by Nicaragua